Alejandro Ciangherotti (1940 – 30 May 2004) was a Mexican film actor. He appeared in 45 films between 1953 and 1999.

Selected filmography

Film

 The Coward (1953) - Roberto, niño (uncredited)
 The Second Woman (1953) - Ramón, niño
 Los que no deben nacer (1953)
 El niño y la niebla (1953) - Daniel
 Amor y pecado (1956) - Miguel adolescente
 Bodas de oro (1956)
 Esposas infieles (1956)
 Pepito as del volante (1957) - Freddy Larios
 La edad de la tentación (1959) - Andrés Zamacona
 La sombra en defensa de la juventud (1960)
 Cuando regrese mamá (1961) - Ricardo
 Mañana serán hombres (1961) - Vicente
 Muchachas que trabajan (1961) - Amigo de Ricardo
 Jóvenes y rebeldes (1961)
 Jóvenes y bellas (1962)
 La edad de la violencia (1964) - El Zurdo
 ¡Ay, Jalisco no te rajes! (1965) - Charrasqueado
 La recta final (1966) - Raúl Landa
 Nuestros buenos vecinos de Yucatán (1967) - Tony
 Báñame mi amor (1968)
 La isla de los hombres solos (1974) - Jacinto
 El valle de los miserables (1975) - Prisionero
 Tintorera (1977) - Fisherman #1
 Cuchillo (1978)
 El patrullero 777 (1978) - Hombre de serenata
 Cyclone (1978)
 Cananea (1978) - Empleado oficina
 Mil millas al sur (1978) - Mário
 Guyana: Crime of the Century (1979) - Commune Member
 La guerra de los pasteles (1979) - Narciso
 Nora la rebelde (1979)
 Vivir para amar (1980)
 La Pachanga (1981) - Vicente
 Las perfumadas (1983)
 Perico el de los palotes (1984)
 Barrio salvaje (1985)
 Mas buenas que el pan (1987)
 The Last Tunnel (1987) - Septien
 Las movidas del mofles (1987)
 Cacería implacable (1988)
 Solicito marido para engañar (1988)
 Diana, René, y El Tíbiri (1988)
 Cargamento mortal (1989)
 A gozar, a gozar, que el mundo se va acabar (1990)
 Perfume, efecto inmediato (1994)
 El último suspiro (1996)
 Reclusorio III (1999)

Telenovelas
 Cuando seas mía (2001) - Ricardo Sandoval

External links

1940 births
2004 deaths
Mexican male film actors
Mexican people of Argentine descent
Mexican people of Italian descent
Deaths from stomach cancer
Deaths from cancer in Mexico
20th-century Mexican male actors